The Uzbekistani Chess Championship is a chess tournament held in Uzbekistan.

Winners 

{| class="sortable wikitable"
! # !! Year !! Winner
|-
| 1 || 1930 || Azmiddine Khodzhaev
|-
| 2 || 1931 || Fyodor Duz-Khotimirsky
|-
| 3 || 1932 || Sergey von Freymann
|-
| 4 || 1934 || Vasily Panov (off contest), Sergey von Freymann
|-
| 5 || 1935 || Sergey von Freymann
|-
| 6 || 1937 || Sergey von Freymann
|-
| 7 || 1938 || Nikoly Rudnev
|-
| 8 || 1940 || Skripkin
|-
| 9 || 1944 || Vitaly Chekhover
|-
| 10 || 1945 || H. Abdullaev
|-
| 11 || 1946 || A. Airapetov, S. Khodzhibekov
|-
| 12 || 1947 || H. Abdullaev
|-
| 13 || 1948 || Genrikh Kasparian (off contest), A. Airapetov (3rd)
|-
| 14 || 1949 || Zakir Khodzhaev
|-
| 15 || 1950 || Vitaly Tarasov (off contest), Georgy Shakh-Zade
|-
| 16 || 1951 || Alexey Suetin (off contest), Vishniatsky
|-
| 17 || 1952 || Mamadzhan Mukhitdinov, M. Sarvarov
|-
| 18 || 1953 || Batygin, Alexander Grushevsky
|-
| 19 || 1954 || Batygin
|-
| 20 || 1955 || Leonid Shamkovich (off contest), Alexander Grushevsky
|-
| 21 || 1956 || Alexander Grushevsky
|-
| 22 || 1957 || Viktor Korchnoi (off contest), Mamadzhan Mukhitdinov
|-
| 23 || 1958 || Alexander Grushevsky
|-
| 24 || 1959 || L. Barenbaum 
|-
| 25 || 1960 || Alexander Grushevsky 
|-
| 26 || 1961 || Alexander Grushevsky, Georgy Shakh-Zade
|-
| 27 || 1962 || Alexander Grushevsky  
|-
| 28 || 1963 || Alexander Grushevsky, Isaak Birbrager
|-
| 29 || 1964 || Isaak Birbrager, Evgeny Mukhin
|-
| 30 || 1965 || Isaac Boleslavsky (off contest), Mamadzhan Mukhitdinov
|-
| 31 || 1966 || Georgy Borisenko
|-
| 32 || 1967 || ? 
|-
| 33 || 1968 || Georgy Borisenko 
|-
| 34 || 1969 || Sergey T. Pinchuk 
|-
| 35 || 1970 || Leonid Maslov
|-
| 36 || 1971 || Georgy Borisenko 
|-
| 37 || 1972 || Leonid Maslov
|-
| 38 || 1973 || Leonid Maslov
|-
| 39 || 1974 || Levon Grigorian
|-
| 40 || 1975 || Levon Grigorian
|-
| 41 || 1976 || Georgy Agzamov, Valery Loginov
|-
| 42 || 1977 ||I. Ivanov
|-
| 43 || 1978 ||I. Ivanov
|-
| 44 || 1979 || Vladimir Egin
|-
| 45 || 1980 || ?
|-
| 46 || 1981 || Georgy Agzamov
|-
| 47 || 1982 || Valery Loginov
|-
| 48 || 1983 || Raset Ziatdinov
|-
| 49 || 1984 || Valery Loginov
|-
| 50 || 1985 || Raset Ziatdinov
|-
| ? || 1988 || Sergey Zagrebelny
|-
| ? || 1989 || Alexander Nenashev 
|-
| ? || 1990 || Sergey Zagrebelny
|-
| ? || ? || ?
|-
| ? || 1993 || Saidali Iuldachev
|-
| ? || ? || ?
|-
|   || 2001 || Shukhrat Safin
|-
|   || 2002 || ?
|-
| 68 || 2003 || Saidali Iuldachev
|-
| 69 || 2004 || Vladimir Egin
|-
| 70 || 2005 || Anton Filippov
|-
| 71 || 2006 || Alexei Barsov
|-
| 72 || 2007 || Anton Filippov
|-
| 73 || 2008 || Dzhurabek Khamrakulov
|-
| 74 || 2009 || Dzhurabek Khamrakulov
|-
| 75 || 2010 || Alexei Barsov
|-
| 76 || 2011 || Andrey Kvon
|-
| 77 || 2012 || Marat Dzhumaev
|-
| 78 || 2013 || Dzhurabek Khamrakulov
|-
| 79  || 2014 || Ulugbek Tillyaev
|-
| 80  || 2015 || Marat Dzhumaev
|-
| 81 || 2016 ||Nodirbek Yakubboev
|-
| 82 || 2017 ||Alisher Begmuratov
|-
| 83 || 2018 ||Nodirbek Yakubboev
|-
| 84 || 2019 ||Javokhir Sindarov
|-
| 85 || 2020 ||Nodirbek Yakubboev
|-
|86
|2021
|Javokhir Sindarov
|-
|}

Women

{| class="sortable wikitable"
! Year !! Winner
|-
| 2001 || Iroda Khamrakulova
|-
| 2002 || ?
|-
| 2003 ||Lidia Malinicheva
|-
| 2004 || Olga Kim
|-
| 2005 ||Iroda Khamrakulova
|-
| 2006 || Olga Sabirova
|-
| 2007 ||Iroda Khamrakulova
|-
| 2008 || Nafisa Muminova
|-
| 2009 ||Nafisa Muminova
|-
| 2010 ||Olga Sabirova
|-
| 2011 ||Nafisa Muminova
|-
| 2012 || Sarvinoz Kurbonboeva
|-
| 2013 || Hulkar Tohirjonova 
|-
| 2014 ||Sarvinoz Kurbonboeva
|-
| 2015 ||Sarvinoz Kurbonbaeva
|-
| 2016 ||Gulrukhbegim Tokhirjonova
|-
| 2017 ||Nodira Nadirjanova
|-
| 2018 ||Gulrukhbegim Tokhirjonova
|-
| 2019 ||Nilufar Yakubbaeva
|-
| 2020 ||Nilufar Yakubbaeva
|-
| 2021 ||Nilufar Yakubbaeva
|}

References

RUSBASE, part V, 1919–1937 and 1991–1994
RUSBASE, part IV, 1938–1960
RUSBASE, part III, 1961–1969 and 1985–1990
RUSBASE, part II, 1970–1984
2006
2007

Chess national championships
Women's chess national championships
Chess in Uzbekistan